The Wake Up the Souls Tour was a concert tour by Armenian American rock band System of a Down, which commenced in April 2015. The tour was to commemorate the 100th anniversary of the Armenian genocide and raise awareness of the events which saw roughly 1.5 million Armenians killed by the Ottoman Empire government in 1915.

Background
Having announced that they would headline the 2014 KROQ Almost Acoustic Christmas concert, they then announced that they would headline the Rock in Rio festival in Brazil the following September. Rumours then began to spread about a possible full world tour & maybe a new album, particularly because of drummer John Dolmayan's strange but choreographed tweets gradually counting down to the announcement on November 24, 2014. He tweeted the day before "T-Y-W-K" which led many to believe he meant "tomorrow you will know".

The tour started with one stop in North America. System revealed in November 2014 the 'Wake Up The Souls Tour,' scheduled to begin on April 10 at the Wembley Arena in London and finish on April 23 for the band's first ever show in their ethnic homeland of Armenia. Their performance in the capital city of Yerevan at the Republic Square was a free show.

The main objective of the tour was to create awareness and recognition of the genocide to the entire world, particularly in Turkey, whose government does not fully recognise the genocide the preceding Ottoman Empire conducted. The band's announcement on their website called for the Turkish people who stand with the band on the issue of the Armenian genocide to speak out and raise awareness of it.

Tour dates

References

2015 concert tours
System of a Down concert tours